Ahli Qalqilyah is a Palestinian football team from the city of Qalqilyah, that plays in the West Bank Premier League.

References
Photo for 2007 kit colors 

Football clubs in the West Bank

Qalqilya